Cementation is a type of precipitation, a heterogeneous process in which ions are reduced to zero valence at a solid metallic interface. The process is often used to refine leach solutions.

Cementation of copper is a common example.  Copper ions in solution, often from an ore leaching process, are precipitated out of solution in the presence of solid iron.  The iron oxidizes, and the copper ions are reduced through the transfer of electrons.  The reaction is spontaneous because copper is higher on the galvanic series than iron.

  Cu2+(aq) + Fe(s) → Cu(s) + Fe2+(aq)

This was a historically useful process for the production of copper, where the precipitated solid copper metal was recovered as flakes or powder on the surface of scrap iron.

Cementation is used industrially to recover a variety of heavy metals including cadmium, and the cementation of gold by zinc in the Merrill-Crowe process accounts for a substantial fraction of world gold production.

See also

 Bessemer process
  Methods of crucible steel production
  Open-hearth furnace process

References

Metallurgical processes